Charles-Jean-Marie-Félix, marquis de La Valette (25 November 1806 – 2 May 1881) was a French politician and diplomat.

Career
Charles de La Valette was Minister of the Interior and of Foreign Affairs in the government of Emperor Napoleon III.

He was French Ambassador to Constantinople from 1851-53, before the Crimean War, then served as a government minister, before a posting to the Vatican (an ancestral family member Jean Parisot de Valette had been Grand Master of the Order of Malta).

An Anglophile, he finally returned to London in an official capacity as French Ambassador from 1869 to 1870.

Personal life
The Marquis married firstly Maria Garrow Birkett at London in 1828.  Maria, a daughter of the late Daniel Birkett, Esq., of Isleworth, died in 1831, aged 24.

In 1842, he married secondly to Adeline Fowle Welles (1799–1869), the widow of a Boston banker Samuel Welles, who died in 1841.  After twenty-seven years of marriage, Adeline died in 1869.

He married thirdly, in 1871, Georgiana-Gabrielle de Flahaut, marquise douairière de La Valette, who died in 1907; she was sister of Emily, Dowager Marchioness of Lansdowne.

Honours 
  Marquis de France
  Grand-croix, Légion d'honneur
  Chevalier de Malte

See also 
 Famille de La Valette-Parisot

References

External links 

 www.landrucimetieres.fr
 www.vam.ac.uk
 www.interieur.gouv.fr
 www.burkespeerage.com
 Bust of la Marquise de la Valette at the Victoria and Albert Museum

1806 births
1881 deaths
People from Oise
French marquesses
Orléanists
Bonapartists
French Foreign Ministers
French interior ministers
Members of the 7th Chamber of Deputies of the July Monarchy
French Senators of the Second Empire
Ambassadors of France to the United Kingdom
19th-century French diplomats
Grand Croix of the Légion d'honneur
Knights of Malta